Osu is a town in Osun State, Nigeria.

Location 
Osu is located in Atakunmosa West (Osun State) in Nigeria, about 356Km South West of Abuja, the country's capital city.

Economy
Osun State is a flourishing and growing area of Nigeria thanks to the cocoa industry. Many migrant farmers from other parts of Nigeria have settled there. Osu is also one of the centres of cocoa production in the country.

Osu is also known for Akara Osu, a variation of the local delicacy, Akara. Akara Osu has a unique golden-brown exterior with a white interior.

The process of making Akara Osu was a multi-generational business for women in Osu. The women involved in the enterprise became very wealthy. Many mothers built their own houses and contributed to the academic progress of their dependents.

The construction of the express road, which passed through the town and opened up Osu to heavy traffic, contributed immensely in giving these women visibility. Travelers going to Ekiti, Ondo, both Northern and Eastern parts of Nigeria, now pass through Osu,

Gold from Ilesha is mined around the area of Osu.

History 
Osu people originate from the Yoruba ethnic group, who have Ile Ife as their origin. They are all considered descendants of Oduduwa, the progenitor of the Yoruba race. The inhabitants of the town speak a unique dialect of Yoruba.

People 
 Majek Fashek (real name Majekodunmi Fasheke), reggae musician

References 

Populated places in Osun State
Towns in Yorubaland